Bramina is a rural locality of the Snowy Mountains and a civil parish of Buccleuch County, New South Wales.

The parish is located on the border with Australian Capital Territory and is entirely in the Kosciuszko National Park.
Bramina is in the Snowy Valleys Council area and now forms part of the locality of Brindabella.

References

Localities in New South Wales
Parishes of Buccleuch County
Snowy Valleys Council